Paul Crampton (born 28 January 1953) is an English former footballer who played as a full-back.

References

1953 births
Living people
People from Cleethorpes
English footballers
Association football fullbacks
Grimsby Town F.C. players
English Football League players